Stenolechia bathrodyas is a moth of the family Gelechiidae first described by Edward Meyrick in 1935. It is found in Korea and on the Japanese islands of Honshu and Kyushu.

The larvae feed on Juniperus species. They mine the leaves of their host plant.

References

Moths described in 1935
Stenolechia